Vicki Barbolak is an American comedian, speaker, and founder of Wedding Chapel to Go. Barbolak was a top 10 finalist on season 13 of America's Got Talent.

Early life 
Vicki Barbolak was born in Freeport, Illinois. Her mother was a secretary and her father, Pete Barbolak, a former National Football League player, worked in Chicago for the Federal Bureau of Investigation.

Career 
At the age of 38, Barbolak saw an ad for a stand-up comedy class and decided to attend. She quickly realized that making people laugh brought her more happiness and joy than she thought was possible. After a few years of doing open mic, Barbolak was noticed by Mitzi Shore, owner of The Comedy Store, where she further developed her craft. In 2018, she was a contestant in season 13 of America's Got Talent, where she finished as a finalist. In 2019, she began her "Trailer Nasty Tour." She competed in season one of America's Got Talent: The Champions but was eliminated during the first week of the competition. She also competed in Britain's Got Talent: The Champions but was eliminated during the fifth week of the competition.

Barbolak is an ordained minister. She is the founder of Wedding Chapel to Go. She is also a speaker at conferences and organizations where she discusses humor in the workplace.

Personal life 
Barbolak has lived in a trailer for over 25 years. She is married to Lou Brockman, a piano player at the Comedy Store where they met. She lives in Rancho Calevero Mobile Home Park in Oceanside, California.

References

External links
 
 

Living people
Comedians from Illinois
America's Got Talent contestants
People from Freeport, Illinois
American women comedians
20th-century American women
21st-century American women
21st-century American comedians
Year of birth missing (living people)